C. G. Prince (born 25 May 1961) is an Indian  sculptor, based in Kerala. His Birds from my moms Kitchen Cupboard is a well received  series. He is also known as a poet and documentary filmmaker, He graduated in BA English literature & History  from St. Thomas College, Thrissur Prince crafted a huge elephant of steel in the Nehru Park, Thrissur. The elephant is a main attraction of the Nehru park; it is about 16 feet high and  cost a high amount., Prince has also made some notable documentary films like Naadodi Nomad on Dr. Chummar Choondal; the documentary on Chummar Choondal throws light on his invaluable contributions in promoting folk art forms. He has done the painting with drip method in the  1000 sqft canvas titled "Flowers for children" to support the children those who affected flood in kerala 2018

Exhibitions
2000- Don Bosco Boys Town, Karen Nairobi, Kenya
2015- Kerala Sangeeta Nataka academy Solo Exhibition Paintings & Sculptures
2008- Robert Thomas- Galaxy international, USA
2005- Sister of St. Augustine, Kenya

Work Collections at
Don Bosco Boy's Town, Karen Nairobi Kanya
Dr. Rick Lippin USA & Robert Thomas- Galaxy international USA
Kokin- Ryu Souke Myabi- Daike'   Japanese Traditional Drum Group, Tokyo Japan
Sister of St. Augustine Kanya

References

External links 
 Birds of the same feather
 Birth  of a Jumbo
 Children throng renovated Nehru Park in Thrissur
 
 The Hindu : Entertainment Thiruvananthapuram / Music : Painter of evocative swaras

Living people
21st-century Indian poets
21st-century Indian sculptors
People from Thrissur district
Artists from Kerala
1961 births